Call Me by Your Name is a 2017 coming-of-age drama film directed by Luca Guadagnino. The screenplay, written by James Ivory, is based on André Aciman's 2007 novel of the same name. Set in Italy in 1983, the film follows Elio Perlman (Timothée Chalamet), an American-Italian Jewish boy, and Oliver (Armie Hammer), a visiting American Jewish scholar, and their ensuing romantic relationship. Michael Stuhlbarg, Amira Casar, Esther Garrel, and Victoire Du Bois feature in supporting roles. Sayombhu Mukdeeprom served as the cinematographer and Sufjan Stevens contributed three songs to the soundtrack.

The film premiered at the Sundance Film Festival on January 22, 2017. Sony Pictures Classics gave the film a limited release in the United States on November 24, 2017, before a wide release on January 19, 2018. Its $101,219 per theater average was the highest opening average of the year, and has earned $41.9 million at the worldwide box office, against a production budget of $3.5 million. Call Me by Your Name received widespread acclaim, particularly for its direction, cinematography, screenplay, music, and performances. Review aggregator Rotten Tomatoes surveyed 354 reviews and judged 95% of them to be positive. Metacritic calculated a weighted average score of 93/100 based on 53 reviews, indicating "universal acclaim". Call Me by Your Name was Metacritic's fifth-best reviewed film of 2017.

The film garnered four nominations at the 90th Academy Awards, including Best Picture and Best Original Song ("Mystery of Love"). Timothée Chalamet became the third-youngest Best Actor nominee and the youngest since 19-year-old Mickey Rooney in 1939—the first person born in the 1990s to be nominated in the category, and Ivory received his first Academy Award for Best Adapted Screenplay. He also won Best Adapted Screenplay at the 71st British Academy Film Awards, making him the oldest-ever winner in any competitive category for both awards at the age of 89. At the latter award ceremony, the film was also nominated for Best Film, Best Director (Guadagnino), and Best Actor in a Leading Role (Chalamet). Critics' Choice Movie Awards, USC Scripter Award, and Writers Guild of America awarded Ivory for his screenplay.

Call Me by Your Name received three nominations at the 27th Gotham Independent Film Awards, winning Best Feature and Breakthrough Actor for Chalamet. The actor was nominated for Golden Globe Award for Best Actor – Motion Picture Drama, along with nominations for Best Supporting Actor for Hammer, and Best Motion Picture – Drama at its 75th ceremony. The film led the 33rd Independent Spirit Awards with six nominations, winning Best Male Lead (Chalamet) and Best Cinematography (Mukdeeprom). It went on to win the GLAAD Media Award for Outstanding Film – Wide Release at its 29th ceremony. At the 24th Screen Actors Guild Awards, Chalamet was nominated for Outstanding Performance by a Male Actor in a Leading Role. The National Board of Review and Hollywood Film Awards both awarded him their Breakout Actor Awards.

The American Film Institute and National Board of Review included Call Me by Your Name in their list of top ten films of 2017. In Italy, it received six nominations at the 33rd Golden Ciak Awards, winning Best Film, Best Poster, and Best Editing for Walter Fasano. He later won Best Editing at the 73rd Nastro d'Argento Awards. The film won the People's Choice Award for Best European Film at the 31st European Film Awards. In 2019, it garnered twelve nominations at the David di Donatello Awards, including Best Film and Best Director for Guadagnino. The film was also nominated for the Bodil Award for Best Non-American Film and Robert Award for Best English Language Film. At the 61st Annual Grammy Awards, the soundtrack was nominated for Best Compilation Soundtrack for Visual Media, and Stevens received his first nomination for Best Song Written for Visual Media ("Mystery of Love").

Accolades

Notes

See also
 2017 in film

References

External links 
 

Lists of accolades by film
Accolades